Ian Black (15 July 1953 – 22 January 2023) was a British journalist and author focusing on international political issues.

Career
Black was a visiting senior fellow at the Middle East Centre at the London School of Economics and Political Science. He was Middle East editor at The Guardian newspaper, starting in 1980 as a reporter, Middle East correspondent, diplomatic editor, European editor and leader writer.

Personal life and death
Black had frontotemporal lobar degeneration (FTLD). He and his wife, Helen Harris, who lived in north London, had two daughters. He also had a son from a previous marriage.

Black died on 22 January 2023, at the age of 69.

Awards
In 2010, Black was awarded a Peace through Media Award by the International Council for Press and Broadcasting at the sixth annual International Media Awards in London.

Works
Ian Black; Benny Morris, Israel's Secret Wars: A History of Israel's Intelligence Services. (Grove Press, 1991) 
Ian Black, Zionism and the Arabs 1936-1939. (Routledge, 2016) 
Ian Black, Enemies and Neighbors: Arabs and Jews in Palestine and Israel, 1917-2017. (Atlantic Monthly Press, 2017)

References

External links
Guardian column by Ian Black

1953 births
2023 deaths
20th-century British non-fiction writers
21st-century British non-fiction writers
Academics of the London School of Economics
British political journalists
The Guardian people
Deaths from frontotemporal dementia